Empress He Fani (何法倪) (339 – 13 September 404), formally Empress Muzhang (穆章皇后, literally "the solemn and polite empress"), semi-formally Empress Yong'an (永安皇后), was an empress of the Eastern Jin dynasty.  Her husband was Emperor Mu.

Life 

He Fani's father He Zhun (何準) was a brother of the one-time prime minister He Chong (何充), who was an important official during the reigns of Emperor Cheng, Emperor Kang, and Emperor Mu. He Zhun had already died by 357, when, based on the account of her high birth, He Fani was selected to be the empress on 19 September. Emperor Mu was 14 and she was 18.

Emperor Mu did not have any sons, with Empress He or anyone else.  After he died in July 361, he was succeeded by his cousin Emperor Ai, and Empress He was not given the title of empress dowager but instead was honored as Empress Mu.  As she was given Yong'an Palace (永安宮) as her residence, she also became known as Empress Yong'an.

Little is known about her life during the reigns of Emperor Ai, his brother Emperor Fei, their granduncle Emperor Jianwen, or Emperor Jianwen's son Emperor Xiaowu.  When the warlord Huan Xuan (Huan Wen's son) usurped the throne from Emperor Xiaowu's son Emperor An in 403, she was still alive, and as she was forced to move from Yong'an Palace (vacated to serve as Emperor An's residence as Prince of Pinggu), her procession went past the imperial temples, and she cried bitterly at the sight of the temples.  Huan Xuan became displeased and, instead of honoring her as a princess dowager as would be expected, he created her only as the Lady of Lingling.  Subsequently, when Liu Yu started an uprising in 404 to restore Emperor An, Huan had her and Emperor An both transported west, but on the way, Huan Xuan's brother-in-law Yin Zhongwen (殷仲文) turned against him and escorted both her and Emperor An's empress Wang Shen'ai back to the capital Jiankang.  She was said to have then ordered that her regular supplies be reduced in light of the warfare that the people had just suffered.  She died later that year and was buried with imperial honors with her husband Emperor Mu, whom she outlived by 43 years.

References 

|- style="text-align: center;"

|-

|-

|- style="text-align: center;"

339 births
404 deaths
Jin dynasty (266–420) empresses
Huan Chu people
4th-century Chinese women
4th-century Chinese people
5th-century Chinese women
5th-century Chinese people